The WAFU Zone B Women's Cup is a women's association football competition contested by national teams of Zone B of the West African Football Union.

The first edition was played in 2018 with eight teams, which included some foreign-based players.

Inaugural Tournament (2018)
Eight teams were drawn in two groups of four. WAFU Zone B member teams were Ivory Coast, Niger, Burkina Faso, Ghana, Nigeria and Benin. Mali (from Zone A) replaced Benin, who had withdrawn shortly before the tournament, and Senegal (from Zone A) were invited to make the numbers up to eight. The tournament was won by Ghana.

Tournament history

Participating nations
Legend

 – Champions
 – Runners-up
 – Third place
 – Fourth place
 – Losing semi-finals
QF – Quarter-finals
GS – Group stage

Q — Qualified for upcoming tournament
 – Did not qualify
 – Withdrew
 – Hosts

References

West African Football Union competitions